Canna tuerckheimii is a species of the Canna genus, belonging to the family Cannaceae. Its specific epithet tuerckheimii commemorates Hans von Türckheim, a 19th-century German plant collector.

Description
Herb up to 5 m tall. Canna tuerckheimii is a relatively large species with vast stems carrying large green leaves and high carried orange-red flowers. Stems of up to 3 — 3.5m (11½ft) in height. Green leaves, relatively large - 30–100 cm x 15–40 cm (12—36in x 6—16in), lower side and sheaths lanuginose. Flowers are erect orange-red, 5.5 –9 cm (2¼—3½in) long; floral tube not curved, composed of 9 coloured parts; petals not reflexed; with 4 staminodes.

Distribution 

Taxonomy
Paulus Johannes Maria Maas and Nobuyuki Tanaka, both experts on the genus Canna, disagree on the correct taxonomic placement of this species, with Tanaka considering the correct placement for the species to be C. latifolia.

Cultivation 
It is hardy to zone 10 and is frost tender. In the north latitudes, it is in flower from August to October, and the early seeds ripen in October.

See also
 List of Canna species
 List of Canna cultivars

References

External links
 
 
 Proposal to conserve the name Canna tuerckheimii

tuerckheimii
Flora of Belize
Flora of Colombia
Flora of Costa Rica
Flora of Ecuador
Flora of Guatemala
Flora of Honduras
Flora of Mexico
Flora of Nicaragua